Christopher James Caiazzo is an American politician. A Democrat, he represents District 28 in the Maine House of Representatives, which includes part of Scarborough, Maine.

Political career 
Caiazzo served as Finance Chair for the Scarborough, Maine Board of Education from 2012 to 2015, and as a member of the Scarborough Town Council from 2015 to 2018.

In 2016, Caiazzo ran for election to represent District 28 in the Maine House of Representatives, but lost to Republican incumbent Heather Sirocki. He ran again in 2018, and won against Republican Linwood Higgins. He is running for re-election in 2020.

Electoral record

Personal life 
Caiazzo earned a Bachelor of Applied Science in Marine Engineering at the Maine Maritime Academy, and was a Lieutenant in the United States Navy Reserve from 1994 to 2005. He and his wife, Beth, have two children.

References 

Year of birth missing (living people)
Living people
Democratic Party members of the Maine House of Representatives
21st-century American politicians
Maine Maritime Academy alumni
Maine city council members
School board members in Maine
People from Scarborough, Maine